The Finnic or Fennic peoples, sometimes simply called Finns, are the nations who speak languages traditionally classified in the Finnic (now commonly Finno-Permic) language family, and which are thought to have originated in the region of the Volga River. The largest Finnic peoples by population are the Finns (or more precisely the Suomi, 6 million), the Estonians (1 million), the Mordvins (800,000), the Mari (570,000), the Udmurts (550,000), the Komis (330,000) and the Sami (100,000).

The scope of the name "Finn" and "Finnic" varies by country. Today, Finnish and Estonian scholars restrict the term "Finnic" to the Baltic Finns, who include the Western Finns of Finland and their closest relatives but not the Sami. In Russia, however, where the Eastern Finns live, the word continues to be used in the broad sense, and sometimes implies the Volga Finns who have their own national republics.

Three groups of people are covered by the names "Finn" and "Finnic" in the broad sense:
 the Sami people spread across northern Scandinavia
 the Baltic Finns, also known as the Western Finns, of Finland, Estonia, Karelia and northwestern Russia
 the Volga Finns and the Perm Finns, also known as the Eastern Finns, of central Russia, including the four central-Russian republics of Komi, Mari El, Mordovia and Udmurtia.
In the 19th century, the Ugrians were considered an additional branch of the Finns (as "Ugrian Finns"), but due to the theory that the Hungarian language is most closely related to the Ugrian languages and because the Hungarians are not ethnically Finns, the Ugrians are now generally excluded.

Linguistically, the situation is more complex: in particular, the unity of the Volga Finnic languages is disputed, and because of this the Permians are sometimes counted as Volga Finns and sometimes not. The distinction is a linguistic one, however, and varies between linguistic reconstructions. Linguistically also, the Finnic peoples are sometimes called "Finno-Ugric", uniting them with the Hungarians, or "Uralic", uniting them also with the Samoyeds, but these linguistic connections were not discovered until the end of the eighteenth and beginning of the twentieth centuries, and do not underlie traditional ethnic identity.

Finnic peoples migrated westward from very approximately the Volga area into northwestern Russia and (first the Sami and then the Baltic Finns) into Scandinavia, though scholars dispute the timing. The ancestors of the Perm Finns moved north and east to the Kama and Vychegda rivers. Those Finnic peoples who remained in the Volga basin began to divide into their current diversity by the sixth century, and had coalesced into their current nations by the sixteenth.

Etymology 

The name "Finn(ic)" is an ancient exonym with scarce historical references and therefore rather questionable etymology. Its probable cognates, like Fenni, Phinnoi, Finnum, and Skrithfinni / Scridefinnum appear in a few written texts starting from about two millennia ago in association with peoples of northern Europe. The first known use of this name to refer to the people of what is now Finland is in the 10th-century Old English poem . Among the first written sources possibly designating western Finland as the "land of Finns" are also two rune stones in Sweden: one in Norrtälje Municipality, with the inscription  (U 582), and the other in Gotland, with the inscription  (G 319 M), dating from the 11th century.

It may thus have originated from an Old Norse word for hunter-gatherer,  (plural ), which is believed to have been applied during the first millennium CE to the (pre–reindeer herding) Sami, and perhaps to other hunter-gatherers of Scandinavia. It was reportedly still used with this meaning in Norway in the 20th century. Thus there is Finnmark in Norway, which can be understood as "Sami country", but also Finnveden in Sweden, in an area that is not known to have been Finnic-speaking. The name was also applied to what is now Finland, which at the time was inhabited by "Sami" hunter-gatherers.

The Icelandic Eddas and Norse sagas (11th to 14th centuries), some of the oldest written sources probably originating from the closest proximity, use words like  and  inconsistently. However, most of the time they seem to mean northern dwellers with a mobile life style. An etymological link between the Sami and the Finland Finns (Saami and Suomi) exists in modern Uralic languages as well.

Other etymological interpretations associate the ethnonym "Finns" with fen in a more toponymical approach. Yet another theory postulates that the words finn and kven are cognates.

See also
 Chud
 Fenni
 Fenno-Scandinavia
 Finnic mythologies
 Finno-Ugric languages

References

Finnic peoples